Raasaleela is a 1975 Indian Malayalam-language film directed by N. Sankaran Nair and produced by Carmel Johny for RJD Films, starring Kamal Haasan and Jayasudha in her Malayalam debut. It is a remake of the Tamil film Unarchigal, which also starred Kamal Haasan but got released before the original. Rasaleela was dubbed and released in both Tamil and Telugu, and ran for 100 days each in their respective language cities.

Cast 
 Kamal Haasan as Devan
 Jayasudha as Unnimaya
 M. G. Soman
 Sankaradi 
 Bahadoor
 Kanakadurga
 Manimala
 Rajasree (Gracy)

Production 
Raasaleela is a remake of the Tamil film Unarchigal, which also starred Kamal Haasan, but got released before the original. The film directed by N. Sankaran Nair, story written by R. C. Sakthi and Kamal Haasan.

Remake 
In 2012, Majeed Marangery remade the film with the same title. However, it failed to repeat the success.

Soundtrack 

The music was composed by Salil Chowdhary and the lyrics were written by Vayalar Ramavarma.

References

External links 
 

1970s Malayalam-language films
Malayalam remakes of Tamil films
Films scored by Salil Chowdhury
Films directed by N. Sankaran Nair